R v Wallace (1931) 23 Cr App R 32 is a leading English criminal case, the first time a conviction for murder was overturned on the ground that the verdict "cannot be supported, having regard to the evidence", as provided for by Section 4(1) of the Criminal Appeal Act 1907. The headnote states: "The Court will quash a conviction founded on mere suspicion".

William Herbert Wallace, a 52-year-old insurance agent, had been convicted at the Liverpool Assizes in 1931 of the brutal murder of his wife, Julia Wallace, and sentenced to death.

Facts
The case against Wallace was entirely circumstantial, with several curious aspects. The night before the murder a telephone message had been left for Wallace at his chess club, requesting that he call on "R.M. Qualtrough" at 7.30pm the following evening to discuss an insurance policy. The address given was in Mossley Hill, a district of south Liverpool several miles from Wallace's home in Anfield. Wallace arrived at the chess club about 25 minutes after the phone call, and was informed of the message by the club captain, Samuel Beattie.

The following night Wallace left home at about 6.45pm, catching several trams to Mossley Hill. During his journey, and subsequent search, he inquired of numerous people — including a policeman — directions to "25 Menlove Gardens East", the address Qualtrough had given. It became apparent that while there were Menlove Gardens North, South and West, there was no Menlove Gardens East, and no trace of Qualtrough either. After spending about 40 minutes inquiring around the district, Wallace got a tram home. Entering the house at about 8.45pm in the presence of his terraced neighbours John Sharpe Johnston and Florence Sarah Johnston, he found his wife bludgeoned to death in the parlour, with evidence of a bungled robbery.

The Police discovered that the telephone call had been made from a public call box only 400 yards from Wallace's home, and hypothesised that Wallace had made the call himself to create an elaborate alibi, and had in fact murdered his wife before leaving his house the following evening. However, no trace of blood was found on Wallace even when his clothing was benzidine tested, although the killer would have been heavily bloodstained, and a milk-boy's testimony of seeing Mrs. Wallace alive sometime between 6.30pm and 6.45pm left Wallace scarcely enough time to kill his wife, clean himself up, and stage a robbery before catching his tram. The murder-weapon was not found, and no motive could be ascribed to Wallace in killing his wife. On the contrary, Wallace, 52, was in poor health, and his wife had fulfilled the role of companion and occasional nurse (though the couple often employed outside help when in poor health). They had been married 17 years and had no children.

When investigations into other suspects such as Richard Gordon Parry fell flat, the Police charged Wallace with murder.

At the committal hearing, several factual misstatements were made by the Prosecuting Solicitor, and these were widely reported in the local press. The feeling in Liverpool was anti-Wallace, and although the jury was selected from outside the city environs, they came from nearby towns, which could have been infected by prejudice. Wallace cut an austere, fusty figure, and his stoicism throughout his ordeal, combined with his intellectual hobbies of chess, botany and chemistry, gave the impression to some of a cold, calculating killer who had contrived to commit the perfect murder.

Wallace was tried at St. George's Hall at the Assizes in April, 1931. Edward Hemmerde, KC led for the Crown, assisted by Leslie Walsh. Roland Oliver, KC, assisted by Sydney Scholefield Allen, led for the Defence (instructed by solicitor Hector Munro of H.J. Davis, Berthen and Munro).

During cross-examination it became clear that the police surgeon had blundered, in not taking temperature to ascertain the time of death, and the Police had allowed the poorly-preserved crime-scene to become cross-contaminated. Indeed, the investigating officers' fingerprints were found all over the crime scene, and in different photographs of the same rooms many objects are in different positions or even entirely absent.

Beattie, the recipient of the telephone message at the chess-club, who knew Wallace well, was unshakable in his opinion that the voice was not Wallace's.

Verdicts

Trial
The trial judge, Mr. Justice Wright, summed up for an acquittal:

There was general surprise when, after an hour's deliberation, the jury returned with a verdict of guilty.

Mr. Justice Wright, after pointedly omitting the customary thanks to the jury, passed the mandatory sentence of death on William Herbert Wallace.

Church of England's intervention

No sooner had Wallace been sentenced to death, than public opinion started to swing in his favour. In a unique act, the Church of England offered special prayers - "intercessions extraordinary" at Liverpool Cathedral.

Court of Appeal
The prospects for Wallace's appeal were not good, however. Never before had the Court of Criminal Appeal overturned a conviction in a capital case on the grounds that the verdict was "unreasonable, or cannot be supported having regard to the evidence", and those were the only realistic grounds of appeal available to Wallace.

The Appeal was heard on 18 May and 19 May 1931 at the Royal Courts of Justice, Strand, London by Lord Chief Justice Hewart, sitting with Mr Justice Hawke and Mr Justice Branson.

Exchanges with Hemmerde KC
There were several key interventions from the Judges on 19 May, as Hemmerde KC made the case for the Crown.

Mr. Justice Branson: "Assuming that the murder had been committed, what evidence is there that the telephone call was put through by the appellant?"

Hemmerde KC: "Of course, there is no direct evidence and there could not be. If a man chooses to make a bogus telephone call upon himself there never could be any direct evidence except someone who saw him do it."

Mr. Justice Branson: "I rather felt as you were putting your case that you were assuming it was he who made the call because of what happened afterwards, and then saying that he must be guilty because he put through the call."

Lord Chief Justice Hewart: "In other words, you use as a step in your argument that which is only consolidated when your argument is complete."

Hemmerde KC: "I think I accept that, my Lord."

Lord Chief Justice Hewart: "Are you not really saying, if it be assumed this appellant committed the murder, other circumstances fit in with that theory?"

Hemmerde KC: "I shall submit to your Lordships that.. one is brought almost irresistibly to the conclusion that the pieces fit together just like a jig-saw puzzle."

Mr. Justice Branson: "If what he does is consistent only with his having been the author of the telephone message, then I follow your argument, but if what he does is consistent not only with that but with somebody else having sent the telephone message, then the subsequent actions do not help you... No doubt it is a question of fact, but the question is what is the evidence from which that fact is to be inferred?"

Hemmerde KC: "I submit that the only evidence from which it can be inferred is the evidence of his suspicions actions."

Judgment
Unusually, the Court retired for 47 minutes, to consider its verdict. The ruling, delivered by Lord Hewart CJ said:

See also
English criminal law

Bibliography
 Murder Most Mysterious (1932) by Hargrave Lee Adam, online copy at The Internet Archive
The Trial of William Herbert Wallace (1933) by W. F. Wyndham-Brown, online copy at The Internet Archive
 Verdict in Dispute (1950) by Edgar Lustgarten, online copy at The Internet Archive
Wallace: The Final Verdict (1985) by Roger Wilkes. Grafton 
The Murder of Julia Wallace (2001) by James Murphy. Bluecoat Press 
The Killing of Julia Wallace (2012) by John Gannon. Amberley 
Move to Murder (2018) by Antony M Brown. Mirror Books

Footnotes

1931 in case law
1931 in British law
W
Court of Appeal (England and Wales) cases
Crime in Liverpool